Barry Town United Football Club is a semi-professional association football team based in Barry, Wales. They are known for representing Wales in Europe as winners of the Cymru Premier and Welsh Cup during the 1990s and early 2000s and have also competed in England's Southern League and FA Cup. The team, which has contained more than 50 full internationals, is now run by supporters. They play at their traditional home of Jenner Park, Barry, which holds 3,500 spectators.

History

Formation

Barry Town United's history dates back to 1892 when an association football team named Barry and Cadoxton District was formed in the area. During the early years, this side endured many upheavals, playing on five different grounds under various identities, including Barry Unionist Athletic, Barry United Athletic and Barry District. Players who featured during these years included Ted Vizard and Billy Jennings; who would each go on to play in the famous 'White Horse' FA Cup Final.
 
In November 1912, a meeting at The Windsor public house in Holton Road saw townsfolk choose to pursue membership of the thriving Southern League as Barry AFC (the 'Town' suffix was added after World War II). The club would secure land owned by the Jenner family and the people of the town came together to build Jenner Park, ahead of the first match of the 1912–13 season.

On 6 September 1913, Barry played their first fixture; a Southern League match against Mid-Rhondda at Jenner Park. The game attracted 4,000 spectators, including 1,000 travelling supporters.

Fittingly, the new team would register a surprise, albeit merited, victory, with Barry's Ralph Isherwood scoring the very first goal at Jenner Park just three minutes in. His second, midway through the second half, sealed a 2–1 victory, a fine start for the Barry side on, coincidentally, the same afternoon that Arsenal played their first match at Highbury.

The ensuing two seasons would see Stoke City, Brentford, Coventry City and others visit the new ground. However, the Great War would soon interrupt any competitive proceedings; with Barry captain Major James Wightman one of the many casualties of The Battle of the Somme.

Southern League success
The 1920–21 season ranks as one of the finest in Barry's history, as they surprised many by becoming champions of the Southern League's Welsh section. The achievement was all the more impressive when considering the small Barry squad played over 100 matches in all competitions during the course of the season. Competing simultaneously in both the Welsh and Western League, the Barry board gave priority to Southern League fixtures, swayed by aspirations of joining the new English Third Division.

Inspired by Stanley Cowie, the title was clinched in early May, and yet hopes of Barry being able to move up to the Football League were scuppered just a month later, when their application failed and Charlton Athletic and Aberdare Athletic (the latter of whom finished second to Barry in their section) were elected instead.

Barry retained membership of the Southern League for more than 60 years – their highest finish being fourth in the 1930s. Among the notable players of the era were Johnny Gardner (with over 500 appearances), Dai Ward (scorer of more than 300 goals) and Fred Whitlow (a 100+ goal marksman). Meanwhile, Barry-born sportsman Ernie Carless combined his footballing exploits with a successful cricketing career with Glamorgan.

FA Cup and Welsh Cup glory

At the end of the 1920s, a crowd of 6,000 at Upton Park saw Barry beat Dagenham Town 1–0 to progress to the FA Cup 2nd Round; before losing to Brighton & Hove Albion ten days later. It proved to be their most successful run in the competition. Barry would reach the 1st Round again in 1934–35, losing 1–0 to Northampton Town at Jenner Park, but the build-up to the match was tainted by a fire that ravaged the grandstand.

Football again took a backseat in 1939, with the eruption of World War II . Barry's Chris Mason would be captured as a prisoner of war during the conflict, though would return to Jenner Park to resume his career afterwards; entertaining spectators thrilled by the adventures of players such as Derek Tapscott (who would later sign for Arsenal), celebrated striker Stan Richards and Gwilym 'Cannonball' Cain.

In the 1949–50 season, Jenner Park became one of the first grounds in the country to introduce floodlights, with Newport County, Swansea City and Cardiff City all visiting to showcase the facilities. Two seasons later, an all-Welsh showdown in the FA Cup 1st Round saw Barry beaten by Newport, 4–0. Nevertheless, the town's most celebrated footballing achievement was right around the corner.

In May 1955, following a 1–1 draw at the Racecourse in Wrexham, Barry beat Chester City 4–3 at Ninian Park to lift the Welsh Cup for the first time. Former Chelsea right-wing Charlie Dyke scored the winner, a dramatic late free-kick to take the cup back to Barry.

1960s, 1970s and 1980s
In the late 1950s, a host of Scandinavian stars made their way to Jenner Park, and dazzled Barry football enthusiasts with their skill. Among their number were Finland's Hannu Kankkonen and Bengt 'Folet' Berndtsson; a member of the Sweden squad that reached the final of the 1958 World Cup. The influx of players from continental Europe came as a result of chairman John Bailey's business interests overseas.

During this period, the club embarked on an overseas tour, playing three games in Malta in 1960 against Sliema Wanderers, Hibernians and Valletta that all ended in draws.

1961 saw another big match as QPR visited Jenner Park in the FA Cup. A crowd of 7,000 saw Laurie Sheffield's opener for Barry cancelled out late on. QPR would win the replay at Loftus Road comfortably. The 1960s and 70s are perhaps most fondly remembered for the personalities that pulled on the Barry shirt. Among them, prolific goalscorers Ken Gully and Clive Ayres, brothers John and Dickie Batt, long-serving Bobby Smith and Ashley Griffiths, and tall defender Mike Cosslett; now a member of the club coaching staff.

In 1982, Barry would leave the Southern League, focusing on Welsh League competition and winning six Welsh League titles before the decade's end; thanks in no small part to the goals of striker Steve Williams. The most significant match of the decade though came on 17 November 1984, as 3,850 crammed into Jenner Park to see Barry vs Reading in the FA Cup 1st Round. Despite Ian Love's goal, an injury-time winner by Trevor Senior was enough to send the Royals through.

Exile and return

After insufficient floodlighting had stopped the club being able to compete in the Southern League for most of the 1980s, the tail end of the decade saw the necessary ground improvements to support a return to England. Barry entered the league's Midland Division and would consistently finish in the top six, yet were denied the opportunity to field a reserve XI in the Welsh League as they had done previously.

The creation of the League of Wales (now Cymru Premier) in 1992 then prompted a decree that Barry would no longer be able to compete in the English pyramid at all while based on Welsh soil. As part of a group of rebel clubs known as the Irate Eight (alongside Newport, Merthyr, Colwyn Bay, Bangor City, Caernarfon Town, Newtown and Rhyl), the Town were forced into exile; with the first team adopting the name of Barri AFC and playing 'home' matches out of Worcester City's ground, while the reserves (by now, a local league outfit), manned the Jenner Park fort. However, this arrangement would last only one season, as chairman O' Halloran performed a shock u-turn that saw the Barry first team return home; eventually accepted into Welsh League Division One for the 1993–94 campaign.

Decade of dominance

Barry's return to Jenner Park would spark the side's most successful period, as they earned immediate promotion to the top flight and a unique quadruple of Welsh League championship, Welsh League Cup, FAW Trophy and Welsh Cup (for the first time since 1955).

The latter was one of the Town's most famous achievements, as they upset Football League Second Division outfit Cardiff City in front of 16,000 spectators at the old National Stadium. Barry's reward for winning the Welsh Cup was a European Cup Winners Cup tie against Žalgiris Vilnius of Lithuania, but they crashed out 7–0 on aggregate. Greater glory was on the horizon.

After one season in the League of Wales, Barry opted to become the league's first fully professional club and, thereafter, won their first league championship in 1995–96. The season was though marred by the deaths of chairman Neil O' Halloran and young midfielder Matthew Holtham, the latter in a motorway accident on the way back from an away match in April.

1996 saw the club create history as the first League of Wales side to progress beyond the opening round of a European competition.

Following victory in Latvia over Dinaburg, Barry ousted Hungarian side Budapest Vasutas in one of several epic European nights at Jenner Park. Despite trailing 3–1 from the away leg, Barry stormed to a victory in the return match by the same score-line, and then won a penalty shoot-out 4–2.

A memorable all-British tie with Scottish Premier League side Aberdeen was their reward and, after losing 3–1 to Roy Aitken's side at Pittodrie, the Welshmen were held to a pulsating 3–3 draw at a rain-swept Jenner Park; exiting the cup in thrilling fashion before a crowd of over 6,000. 

On the domestic scene, Barry were all-conquering, clinching a first treble of League of Wales championship, Welsh League Cup and Welsh Cup. The championship was claimed with a record 105 points and a goal difference of more than +100. In January 1997, the team was part of the first League of Wales match to be broadcast live on television; a 5–2 win over visitors Caernarfon Town that still holds the league's attendance record. Then, from March, Barry went 51 matches without tasting a single defeat in a league fixture.

1999 saw Barry become the first League of Wales team to win the FAW Premier Cup, with a 2–1 win over Wrexham at the club's own Racecourse Ground. Pipped to the title in 2000 by the emerging TNS, Barry would regain their crown the following campaign, while European battles with the likes of Dynamo Kyiv and Boavista saw players of the highest calibre grace Jenner Park (among them, the likes of Andriy Shevchenko and Serhii Rebrov.)

Then, in the 2001–02 season, Barry notably became the first League of Wales team to win a European Champions League tie, when they defeated the Azerbaijan champions FC Shamkir to set up a tie with Portuguese club FC Porto. Barry lost the first leg in Portugal by an emphatic 8–0 margin, after conceding two early penalties in front of a partisan 55,000 crowd. However, the Town would win the home leg 3–1, recording a famous result that has grown in legend with the career success of Porto's Ricardo Carvalho, Helder Postiga and others.

Decline and turmoil
The golden era would not last forever, and the continual challenge of securing enough prize money to sustain their high standards set would eventually catch up with those running the club. After chairperson and backer Paula O' Halloran stood aside, former Scarborough and Grantham Town official Kevin Green came in as the club's new chief executive; yet his varying initiatives failed to stop the rot. In one move that garnered significant press, Green would recruit ex-footballer and celebrity John Fashanu as the club's high-profile chairman in the winter of 2002. Some saw Fashanu as the missing piece of the puzzle, and the man who would help sustain Barry's success going forward. Promising African and Chinese TV deals and an influx of Nigerian internationals, Fashanu made headlines, yet did little to steady a Barry ship in increasingly rough seas. Then, after success on ITV reality show I'm A Celebrity, Get Me Out of Here! saw him attain new-found popularity, Fashanu left the club; which by now was in a perilous financial state.

In the summer of 2003, the club went into administration and the professional squad would quickly disintegrate. An interim management team was appointed, together with an amateur squad drawn primarily from local side N & M Construction of the South Wales Amateur League (five levels below the Welsh Premier). Within a month, Barry had gone from winning a match in Europe to losing 8–0 at Caernarfon Town. Though the professional-era bubble had well and truly burst, fans set about raising money to help keep the club alive. Eventually, mystery man Stuart Lovering arrived to purchase of the club on 10 December 2003. Few could have foreseen what was to come.

2003–04 was a difficult season, with champions Barry's first league win not coming until February 2004 when they beat fellow strugglers Welshpool Town 5–4 with a 98th-minute winning penalty from youngster Luke Sherbon. Manager Colin Addison was brought in resuscitate the team's ailing fortunes, yet the Dragons still ended up bottom of the division, four points off safety, and were relegated to the Welsh League Division One. Controversially, Addison was dismissed by Lovering on the eve of the new campaign, with assistant David Hughes replacing him; only to leave himself months later on finding his budget slashed. In the meantime, an independent district valuer had determined that the club should pay £42,000 in rent and rates each season for the remainder of the lease. Judging the figure to be unfairly based on the club's relinquished professional status, Lovering refused to pay this amount and instead moved the senior side to the White Tips Stadium in Treforest from January 2005 to May 2006. During the absence, a number of staunch supporters formed breakaway club Barry FC; the culmination of a series of disputes with chairman Lovering, who had banned them from fundraising at club. With the Town relegated to their lowest-ever league status at the end of the 2005–06 season, the future appeared bleak for this fallen giant of Welsh football.

Fan-led fightback
While chaos reigned off the field for much of the decade, the roots of recovery began to grow in 2007, with the appointment of new manager Gavin Chesterfield. Chesterfield led Barry to promotion in 2008, with the hope that a winning run of form in the second tier would see the club's dwindling support return. After stumbling early on, Barry enjoyed a 21-match unbeaten streak and finished the season a credible third. Nevertheless, the team's achievements were continually overshadowed by events behind the scenes.

In December 2008, a crisis meeting at Jenner Park saw supporters come forward to pledge their commitment to operating the first team (forming a new company for this purpose), to allow Lovering to focus on finding a buyer. In one of a number of close calls, the club appeared on the verge of being sold in 2010, when businessman Clayton Jones appeared to strike a deal. However, this fell through at the eleventh hour, scuppering a plan to bring in Wales international John Hartson as Director of Football.

Undeterred, 2010 saw the Stand Up For Barry campaign launch, using new social media platforms such as Twitter to spread news of the club's plight with a wider online audience. The resulting support from across the football community proved an invaluable asset as supporters strived to keep the club alive.

Shortly after the close of the 2010–11 season, Lovering announced his fresh intent of withdrawing the first team from higher league competition. To prevent this, the Barry Town Supporters' Committee (BTSC) took complete control of all football and its funding; resulting in what became known to some supporters as the 'DIY Football' era. In the months that followed, the rejuvenated, fan-run Barry set-up enjoyed their most successful Welsh Cup campaign in several seasons; defeating rivals Merthyr Town at Penydarren Park and winning at Haverfordwest County in extra-time, before being edged out 3–2 at Newport County.

2012 marked the 100th anniversary of the club's formation, with a series of events lined up to mark this and the subsequent centenary season. To launch the festivities, the BTSC hosted Cardiff City in an August fundraising friendly attended by 2,000 spectators. However, Lovering's threats to withdraw Barry from the Welsh Football League would intensify in the weeks prior, threatening to cast a cloud over these celebrations. Nevertheless, the BTSC held a successful '100 Years of Barry Town' event at the Angel Hotel (attended by many past and present players), before the current team beat Welsh League champions Cambrian and Clydach on the 100th anniversary itself.

In March 2013, following wins against Caerleon, Penrhyncoch, Ely Rangers and Pontardawe Town, Barry won 2–0 at Flint Town United to progress to the Welsh Cup semi-final for the first time in a decade. Eventually, the team narrowly lost 1–2 to eventual winners Prestatyn Town, marking the first appearance of a fully amateur Barry side at the Welsh Cup semi-final stage.

Survival and resurgence
On 7 May 2013, Lovering withdrew the senior team from the Welsh Football League, against the will of the BTSC, players and supporters; who were ready, willing and able to fulfill the remaining two league fixtures (both against Ton Pentre). Rejecting this perceived act of sabotage, those running the football outlined their intentions to continue as they were, adopting the Barry Town United suffix to emphasise their continuing unity and endeavour. However, a meeting of the FAW Council in Betws-y-Coed in June 2013 announced that the Barry side would have to play "recreational football" henceforth; a declaration that prompted significant outcry, both locally and further afield.

There appeared hope for beleaguered Barry as second meeting was arranged for July 2013 at Maesmawr Hall in Caersws to hear new evidence as why the team should be able to continue on. At this second gathering, 15 of the FAW Councillors voted against discussing Barry's future, thus concluding the meeting in no more than five minutes and at considerable expense. Notably, it emerged that this decision went against the recommendations of the FAW's own Domestic Committee and legal team.

With their immediate and long-term future unclear, Barry began their pre-season with wins at Moreton and Elmore that same month, followed by a narrow 3–2 loss to Premier League newcomers Cardiff City, watched by a home crowd of 1,650 supporters on Saturday 27 July. Remarkably, given the bizarre set of circumstances, Barry had led 2–1 at half-time.

Eventually, a High Court judge in Cardiff ruled in Barry's favour; stating that the FAW Council had acted unlawfully in denying them their licence to play Welsh League football. As a result, the fan-run Town side was entered back into the structure.

In the years that have followed, Barry would win two consecutive league titles, reclaiming their place in the second tier, while continuing to develop as a club, on and off the pitch. Today, the club competes at senior, development, youth and junior levels, along with various ladies' teams and pan disability sides in the over and under-16 age groups. In the 2016–17 season, the first team reached the final of Welsh League Cup for the first time since 2001, becoming only the second side from outside the national top flight to achieve this feat since the competition was expanded several years prior. In April 2017, the club secured its return to the Welsh Premier as champions of the Welsh Football League, continuing this remarkable revival.

On Saturday 6 April 2019, a remarkable 5–2 victory at Bala Town, coupled with a 6–0 win for The New Saints away against Newtown, ensured Barry would finish at least third in the 2018–19 JD Cymru Premier and qualify for the preliminary round of the UEFA Europa League. This marked a remarkable transformation for the club, qualifying for European competition for the first time since winning the JD Cymru Premier in the 2002–03 season.

A second European appearance in as many years would follow, as Barry travelled to the Faroe Islands to play NSI Runavik in a one-legged tie, following the abandonment of the 2019-20 season in wake of the Covid-19 pandemic. However, the club's league results had begun to decline and Barry were ultimately relegated to the Cymru South in April 2022, having finished 11th out of 12 in the 2021-22 Cymru Premier.

Colours
For many decades, Barry wore green as their primary colour – thought to be due to officials securing the club's first kit from Plymouth Argyle. On exile in 1992, Barri adopted a red and white strip, which would remain with them on their return to the Welsh pyramid. It was the following season that the club adopted its yellow change kit (deemed lucky for the success it brought in Welsh Cup competition) as a home strip – and it is this colour that has become synonymous with Town football, with variations including uses of blue.

Two of the club's most memorable home strips are the fluorescent lime and navy ordered in error in 2006, and the experimental claret and blue kit worn in the early 1970s – both of which saw the club simultaneously plummet in footballing fortune. Nowadays, the club tends to wear yellow at home and green on the road. In the 2020–2021 season, Barry will wear a red away kit.

Stadium

Jenner Park occupies the space of land between Gladstone Road and Barry Road in central Barry and has been the setting for the evolution of Barry's senior football club for more than 100 years.

Named after the Jenner family who had gifted the land, the ground was built by the Barry football enthusiasts for their representative side to compete at the highest possible level and was completed between the landmark meeting of 1912 and the opening fixture of 1913–14.

Among the most notable Barry matches played at Jenner Park have been European ties, domestic cup finals, major semi-finals and quarter-finals, FA Cup fixtures, televised matches, testimonials, high-scoring thrillers and friendlies against high-profile opposition.

Comprised initially of two wooden stands, popular bank terracing was added in 1923 and floodlights added in the 1940s, allowing Jenner Park to host Wales' first floodlit football match between Barry and Newport in 1949–50.

During the 1980s, the local council rebuilt Jenner Park, installing a synthetic running track, a new all-seater stand and improved floodlights.

To bring Jenner Park up to UEFA standards, a second covered stand was built in the mid 1990s, boosting the seating capacity to 2,500. This was temporarily increased to 6,000+ for the visits of Aberdeen and Manchester United with the use of temporary bleachers.

Recent years have seen the addition of a special viewing area for wheelchair users in the grandstand (known colloquially as the 'Old Stand'), accessible via the stadium's Devon Avenue entrance. Meanwhile, October 2015 saw work completed on a new, state-of-the-art 3G pitch, with its inaugural game, a Welsh Cup match against Aberdare Town.

Current squad

Technical staff

Championships

Cymru Premier (7)
1995–96, 1996–97, 1997–98, 1998–99, 2000–01, 2001–02, 2002–03
Welsh League Division One (9)1926–27, 1982–83, 1983–84, 1984–85, 1985–86, 1986–87, 1988–89, 1993–94, 2016–17
Welsh League Division Two (3)1951–52, 1957–58, 2014–15
Welsh League Division Three (1)2013–14

Southern League (1)
1920–21

Championship seasons

Championship play-offs

This match pitted the winners of the Southern League's English and Welsh sections against each other to determine an overall champion.

Honours

Welsh Cup (6)
1954–55, 1993–94, 1996–97, 2000–01, 2001-02, 2002–03

Cymru Premier (7)
1995–96, 1996–97, 1997–98, 1998–99, 2000–01, 2001–02, 2002–03

Welsh League Division One (9)
1926–27, 1982–83, 1983–84, 1984–85, 1985–86, 1986–87, 1988–89, 1993–94, 2016–17

Welsh League Division Two (3)
1951–52, 1957–58, 2014–15

Welsh League Division Three (1)
2013–14

Southern League (1)
1920–21

League of Wales Cup (4)
1996–97, 1997–98, 1998–99, 1999–2000

FAW Premier Cup (1)
1998–99

FAW Trophy (1)
1993–94

Welsh League Cup (6)
1934–35, 1946–47, 1978–79, 1982–83, 1986–87, 1993–94

South Wales Senior Cup (15)
1925–26, 1926–27, 1937–38, 1938–39, 1952–53, 1953–54, 1958–59, 1959–60, 1965–66, 1975–76, 1977–78, 1983–84, 1986–87, 1987–88, 1991–92

West Wales Senior Cup (1)
1927–28

Cup finals

Awards

BBC Wales Sport Team of the Year
1996

European competition

Barry have played 27 competitive games in European club competitions; in the UEFA Champions League, UEFA Cup and Cup Winners Cup. The team has won three full qualifying ties, defeating opposition from Latvia, Hungary and Azerbaijan, in addition to single victories against FC Porto and Vardar Skopje and draws with Aberdeen, Valletta and Cliftonville. The club has scored 22 goals in regular European play, as well as four shootout penalties. Their return to European football came in the summer of 2019, after an absence of 16 seasons. They followed this up with another European tie the following summer, this time against Faroese opposition NSÍ Runavík where Kayne McLaggon became the first Barry player to score in Europe for 17 years.

FA Cup qualification

The club competed regularly in the FA Cup, prior to 1993. The table below denotes the occasions on which the team progressed through the qualifying rounds to the first round. Barry's sole second round appearance came in 1929 against Brighton and Hove Albion, after a replay win over Dagenham Town at the Boleyn Ground, home of West Ham United.

Team records

Record wins
 13–0 vs Milford United (H), Welsh League, 26 January 1985.
 12–0 vs Cemaes Bay (H), Welsh Premier, 4 April 1998.
 12–1 vs Bedminster (H), FA Cup, 10 October 1927.

Record defeats
0–11 vs Llanelly (A), Welsh League, 6 August 1961.
1–11 vs Newport (A), Southern League, 16 December 1932.
0–10 vs Bath (A), Southern League Cup, 29 August 1966.

High-scoring matches
10–5 vs Merthyr (A), Southern League, 19 February 1930.
6–6 vs Gillingham (H), Southern League, 15 March 1947.
6–6 vs Bristol Rovers (A), Southern League, Date unknown.

Full internationals

{|
|-
|valign="top"|

|width="1"| 
|valign="top"|

|width="1"| 
|valign="top"|

|width="1"| 
|valign="top"|

|width="1"| 
|valign="top"|
{| class="wikitable"
|-

! Pos.
! Player
|-
|-
|GK|| Abiodun Baruwa
|-
|GK|| David Forde
|-
|DF|| Atif Bashir
|-
|DF|| Paul Ramsay
|-
|MF|| Bengt Berndtsson
|-
|MF|| Jackie Brown
|-
|MF|| Stig Holmqvist
|-
|MF|| Hannu Kankkonnen
|-
|MF|| Rolf Rosqvist
|-
|MF|| Theo Wharton
|-
|FW|| Nathaniel Jarvis

Hall of Fame

The club's Hall of Fame was established by the Barry Town Supporters Committee in the 2011–12 season to celebrate the achievements of past players, managers and other influential figures. Further additions are set to be made each year.

Other information
 The paperback book The Linnets – An Illustrated, Narrative History of Barry Town AFC, 1888–1993 by Jeff McInery was published in 1993, and is available locally.
A number of fanzines devoted to the club have been published, including The Unofficial Programme, 38 Hours From Vilnius, Yma O Hyd and Keep It Going, Cohen.

External links
Barry Town United Website
Barry Town United Facebook
Barry Town United Twitter

References

 
1912 establishments in Wales
Association football clubs established in 1912
Football clubs in Wales
Southern Football League clubs
Sport in the Vale of Glamorgan
Barry, Vale of Glamorgan
Cymru Premier clubs
Welsh Football League clubs